Haldwani is a city in the Indian state of Uttarakhand.

Haldwani may also refer to:

Haldwani railway station, a main railway station located in Haldwani
Haldwani Municipal Corporation, the civic body that governs the city of Haldwani
Haldwani (Uttarakhand Assembly constituency), one of the seventy electoral Uttarakhand Legislative Assembly constituencies of Uttarakhand state in India